Richard Gardiner Casey (17 December 1846 – 25 April 1919) was a politician in Queensland, Australia. He was a Member of the Queensland Legislative Assembly.

Early life

Richard Gardiner Casey was born on 17 December 1846 in Hobart, Van Diemen's Land (present day Tasmania), the son of Dr Cornelius Gavin Casey and his wife Letitia (née Gardiner).

Casey was educated at Hobart High School and Launceston Grammar School.

On 23 May 1888, Richard Gardiner Casey married Evelyn Jane Harris at St John's Anglican Cathedral, Brisbane, Queensland; the service was conducted by the Rev. Benjamin Glennie. Evelyn was the daughter of George Harris (a Member of the Queensland Legislative Council) and granddaughter of George Thorn (senior) of the Normanby pastoral station (a Member of the Queensland Legislative Council). The reception was held at the bride's parents' residence, Newstead House (then one of Brisbane's finest homes), after which the couple left for a honeymoon at Sandgate, then a popular beachside holiday resort.

The couple had three children: 
 Richard Gavin Gardner Casey (1890–1976), a Governor-General of Australia 
 Eileen Ruth Evelyn Casey (1893–1894)
 Dermot Armstrong Casey (1897–1977)

Politics
On 19 May 1888 (the 1888 colonial election) Casey was elected to the Queensland Legislative Assembly in the electoral district of Warrego. He held the seat until the 1893 election.

Later life
Casey was an expert horseman and owner of several good racehorses. He served as Chairman of the Victorian Racing Club from 1907 to 1916, when he and his wife sailed to England to be nearer to their sons who were with the AIF in France.

References

Members of the Queensland Legislative Assembly
1846 births
1919 deaths